|}

The Prix du Jockey Club, sometimes referred to as the French Derby, is a Group 1 flat horse race in France open to three-year-old thoroughbred colts and fillies. It is run at Chantilly over a distance of 2,100 metres (about 1 mile and 2½ furlongs) each year in early June.

History
The format of the race was inspired by the English Derby, and it was named in homage to the Jockey Club based at Newmarket in England. It was established in 1836, and it was originally restricted to horses born and bred in France. Its distance was initially 2,500 metres, and this was cut to 2,400 metres in 1843. It was switched to Versailles during the Revolution of 1848, and it was cancelled due to the Franco-Prussian War in 1871.

The race was abandoned in 1915, and for three years thereafter it was replaced by the Prix des Trois Ans. This took place at Moulins in 1916, Chantilly in 1917 and Maisons-Laffitte in 1918. The first two runnings after World War I were held at Longchamp.

A substitute race called the Prix de Chantilly was run at Auteuil over 2,600 metres in 1940. The Prix du Jockey Club was staged at Longchamp in 1941 and 1942, and at Le Tremblay over 2,300 metres in 1943 and 1944. It returned to Longchamp for the following three years, and on the second occasion it was opened to foreign participants.

The present system of race grading was introduced in 1971, and the Prix du Jockey Club was classed at the highest level, Group 1. The first foreign-trained horse to win was Assert in 1982. The distance was shortened to 2,100 metres in 2005.

Nine winners of the Prix du Jockey Club have subsequently won the Prix de l'Arc de Triomphe. The first was Ksar in 1921, and the most recent was Dalakhani in 2003.

Records
Leading jockey (9 wins):
 Yves Saint-Martin – Reliance (1965), Nelcius (1966), Tapalque (1968), Sassafras (1970), Acamas (1978), Top Ville (1979), Darshaan (1984), Mouktar (1985), Natroun (1987)

Leading trainer (10 wins):
 Tom Jennings, Sr. – Porthos (1852), Monarque (1855), Ventre Saint Gris (1858), Black Prince (1859), Gabrielle d'Estrees (1861), Consul (1869), Insulaire (1878), Zut (1879), Albion (1881), Dandin (1882)

Leading owner (12 wins):
 Marcel Boussac – Ramus (1922), Tourbillon (1931), Thor (1933), Cillas (1938), Pharis (1939), Ardan (1944), Coaraze (1945), Sandjar (1947), Scratch (1950), Auriban (1952), Philius (1956), Acamas (1978)

Winners since 1950

Earlier winners

 1836: Franck
 1837: Lydia
 1838: Vendredi
 1839: Romulus
 1840: Tontine
 1841: Poetess
 1842: Plover
 1843: Renonce 1
 1844: Lanterne
 1845: Fitz Emilius
 1846: Meudon
 1847: Morok
 1848: Gambetti
 1849: Experience
 1850: Saint Germain
 1851: Amalfi
 1852: Porthos
 1853: Jouvence
 1854: Celebrity
 1855: Monarque
 1856: Lion 1
 1857: Potocki
 1858: Ventre Saint Gris
 1859: Black Prince
 1860: Beauvais
 1861: Gabrielle d'Estrees
 1862: Souvenir
 1863: La Toucques
 1864: Bois Roussel
 1865: Gontran
 1866: Florentin
 1867: Patricien
 1868: Suzerain
 1869: Consul
 1870: Bigarreau
 1871: no race
 1872: Revigny
 1873: Boiard
 1874: Saltarelle
 1875: Salvator
 1876: Kilt
 1877: Jongleur
 1878: Insulaire
 1879: Zut
 1880: Beauminet
 1881: Albion IV
 1882: Dandin / Saint James 2
 1883: Frontin
 1884: Little Duck
 1885: Reluisant
 1886: Sycomore / Upas 2
 1887: Monarque II
 1888: Stuart
 1889: Clover
 1890: Heaume
 1891: Ermak
 1892: Chene Royal
 1893: Ragotsky
 1894: Gospodar
 1895: Omnium II
 1896: Champaubert
 1897: Palmiste
 1898: Gardefeu
 1899: Perth
 1900: La Moriniere
 1901: Saxon
 1902: Retz
 1903: Ex Voto
 1904: Ajax
 1905: Finasseur
 1906: Maintenon
 1907: Mordant
 1908: Quintette / Sea Sick 2
 1909: Negofol
 1910: Or du Rhin
 1911: Alcantara
 1912: Friant
 1913: Dagor
 1914: Sardanapale
 1915: no race
 1916: Teddy
 1917: Brumelli
 1918: Montmartin
 1919: Tchad
 1920: Sourbier
 1921: Ksar
 1922: Ramus
 1923: Le Capucin
 1924: Pot au Feu
 1925: Belfonds
 1926: Madrigal
 1927: Mon Talisman
 1928: Le Correge
 1929: Hotweed
 1930: Chateau Bouscaut
 1931: Tourbillon
 1932: Strip the Willow
 1933: Thor
 1934: Duplex
 1935: Pearlweed
 1936: Mieuxce
 1937: Clairvoyant
 1938: Cillas
 1939: Pharis
 1940: Quicko
 1941: Le Pacha
 1942: Magister
 1943: Verso II
 1944: Ardan
 1945: Coaraze
 1946: Prince Chevalier
 1947: Sandjar
 1948: Bey
 1949: Good Luck

1 The 1843 and 1856 races finished as dead-heats, but each was decided by a run-off.2 The 1882, 1886 and 1908 races were dead-heats and have joint winners.

See also
 List of French flat horse races

References

 France Galop / Racing Post:

 galop.courses-france.com:
 1836–1859, 1860–1889, 1890–1919, 1920–1949, 1950–1979, 1980–present
 prixdujockeyclub.com – Official website.
 france-galop.com – A Brief History: Prix du Jockey Club.
 galopp-sieger.de – Prix du Jockey Club.
 horseracingintfed.com – International Federation of Horseracing Authorities – Prix du Jockey Club (2016).
 pedigreequery.com – Prix du Jockey Club – Chantilly.
 tbheritage.com – Prix du Jockey Club.

Flat horse races for three-year-olds
Chantilly Racecourse
Horse races in France
Recurring sporting events established in 1836
1836 establishments in France